The 2011–12 FA Women's Premier League Cup was the 22nd edition of the cup tournament for teams both levels of the Women's Premier League, the National Division and the Northern and Southern Divisions, the second and third levels of English women's football respectively. The cup was won by National Division side Sunderland after defeating Leeds United 2-1 at Sixfields Stadium, Northampton. In the same season, Sunderland also won the Women's Premier League National Division title, beating Leeds United to the title by just a single point, to complete a cup and league double.

Group stage

Group 1

Group 2

Group 3

Group 4

Group 5

Group 6

Group 7

Knock-out stage

First round

Quarter finals

Semi-finals

Final 

FA Women's National League Cup
Prem